Khyati Mangla (born 22 September 1988) is an Indian television actress who appeared in the Hindi television drama series, Neem Neem Shahad Shahad, in which she played the main character of Nirali.

Early life
Khyati Mangla was born in Ranchi. She did her Std. XII in Arts stream from DAV Public School, Hehal Ranchi, Jharkhand in 2007.

Career
She did TVC for Zee Marathi, Rasoi Magic Masala. She has also appeared in a music video for Asha Bhonsle and Ghulam Ali "Naina Re" in 2010. She attended on a scholarship the Kishore Namit Kapoor Acting Institute in 2009.
She did acting training from Kishore Namit Kapoor Acting lab(KNK) Mumbai, Maharashtra.
She got her first tele-serial Baat Hamari Pakki Hai which was aired on Sony Entertainment Television from May 31, 2010 to February 25, 2011. Then she did a promo for SAB TV with actor Gaurav Khanna. She got her second tele-serial Neem Neem Shahad Shahad which aired on Sahara One from 15 August 2011. In February 2014,Khyati acted in an episode of Bindass channel serial Yeh Hai Aashiqui along with Anurag Sharma.Parineeti Chopra and Sidharth Malhotra made an appearance in that episode.

Television
2010–11 Baat Hamari Pakki Hai as Shreya 
2011-12 Neem Neem Shahad Shahad as Nirali
2011 Tujh Sang Preet Lagai Sajna as Nirali
2014 Yeh Hai Aashiqui as Nikita
2015 Swaragini - Jodein Rishton Ke Sur as Uttara Ram Prasad Maheshwari
2017 Sankatmochan Mahabali Hanuman as Urmila

References

External links
 

1988 births
Living people
Indian television actresses